Diplomatic relations between France and Ukraine were established in 1992. Since 2006, Ukraine is an observer in the Francophonie.

Country comparison

State visits 
French President Jacques Chirac made a state visit to Ukraine in September 1998.

Ukrainian President Petro Poroshenko paid a state visit to France on 26 June 2017, when he met with French President Emmanuel Macron. Poroshenko also visited Senlis to meet the Ukrainian community of France and honor memory of Anne of Kiev — Queen of France.

Economic cooperation 
In the first six months of 2017 the trade between the countries grew by 15.2%.

Resident diplomatic missions
 France has an embassy in Kyiv.
 Ukraine has an embassy in Paris.

See also 
 Ukrainians in France
 Ukraine–European Union relations

References

External links 
 French embassy in Kyiv
 French Foreign Ministry about relations with Ukraine
 Ukraine embassy in Paris

 
Ukraine
France